Square Butte is a name used for 11 buttes in Montana.  Two of the most prominent buttes are located in a) Cascade County, Montana, about  due west of Great Falls and in b) Chouteau County, Montana, about  due east of Great Falls and about  due east of the Highwood Mountains.  Charles Marion Russell, the noted Montana western artist used both features as background in his paintings of Montana.

Square Butte in Cascade County

Square Butte in Cascade County, Montana,  is located about  due west of Great Falls, Montana. The highest elevation of the Cascade County Square Butte is 

Square Butte is easily visible for many miles around. It is a prominent feature on the northern skyline as a motorist travels along Interstate 15, west of Great Falls in the vicinity of mile marker 264.  It is also visible on the southern skyline while traveling on Montana Highway 200 in the vicinity of Sun River and Fort Shaw.  To the west of Square Butte is another topographic feature, Crown Butte.

Lewis and Clark Pass crosses the continental divide at the crest of the Northern Rocky Mountains which lie to the west of the Cascade County Square Butte.  From that pass on July 7, 1806 the explorer Meriwether Lewis (of the Lewis and Clark Expedition, 1803-1806) returning eastward from his journey to the mouth of the Columbia River and the Pacific Ocean, saw Square Butte on the skyline of the eastern Montana prairie stating in his journal:"2 m. passing the dividing ridge between the waters of the Columbia and Missouri rivers at 1/4 of a mile [Lewis and Clark Pass]. from this gap which is low and an easy ascent on the W. side, the fort mountain [Square Butte] bears North Eaast, and appears to be distant about 20 miles." From that pass on a clear day, the Cascade County Square Butte can still be seen, not at the 20 miles reported by Meriwether Lewis but about  out in the eastern Montana grasslands.

Square Butte in Chouteau County

Square Butte in Chouteau County, Montana,  is located about  due east of the city of Great Falls, Montana, and about  due east of the center of the Highwood Mountains.

Square Butte also forms a unique and easily visible landmark on the horizon.  It is visible from Montana Highway 3 between Geyser and Stanford, Montana.  It is also visible from Montana Highway 80 between Stanford and Geraldine, Montana, which passes just to the east of the butte.  The small almost dormant town of Square Butte, Montana lies just at the base of the Chouteau County butte, on Montana Highway 80.  About  to the west of Square Butte is a smaller feature, Round Butte.

Featured in paintings of C. M. Russell

Charles Marion Russell, the noted western Artist, utilized both features as background in his paintings. The well known painting, "Charles M. Russell and His Friends" has the Cascade County Square Butte in the background.  For a view of that painting showing the butte, click on the footnoted source. As an example of the placement of the Chouteau County Square Butte in a Russell painting see "The Tenderfoot", which has the more compact Chouteau County Square Butte in the background.  For a view of that painting showing the butte, click on the footnoted source.

Additional buttes
 Square Butte, Daniels County, Montana, el. , 
 Square Butte, Garfield County, Montana, el. , 
 Square Butte, Garfield County, Montana, el. , 
 Square Butte, Glacier County, Montana, el. , 
 Square Butte, Hill County, Montana, el. , 
 Square Butte, Musselshell County, Montana, el. , 
 Square Butte, Phillips County, Montana, el. , 
 Square Butte, Roosevelt County, Montana, el. , 
 Square Butte, Stillwater County, Montana, el. ,

See also
 List of mountains in Chouteau County, Montana
 List of mountains in Cascade County, Montana

References

Landforms of Chouteau County, Montana
Landforms of Cascade County, Montana